Now That You're Gone may refer to:

 "Now That You're Gone", a single from the album Diana by Diana Ross
 "Now That You're Gone", a single by Shiri Maimon
 "Now That You're Gone" (Sheryl Crow song)
 "Now That You're Gone" (Corina song)
 "Now That You're Gone", a song from the album Throne to the Wolves by From First to Last
 "Now That You're Gone", a single by Tanya Lacey
 "Now That You're Gone", a song from the album Young & Restless by Kristinia DeBarge
 "Now that You're Gone", a song by Ryan Adams
 "Now That You're Gone", a song by Smilez & Southstar
 "Now That You're Gone", a single by Joe Cocker
 "Now That You're Gone", from the album Martha Wash by Martha Wash
 "Now That You're Gone", a song from the album Things We Do by Indigenous
 "Now That You're Gone", a song from the album Is It Friday Yet? by Gord Bamford
 "Now That You're Gone", a song from the album Help Us Stranger by The Raconteurs
"Now That You're Gone", a song by Sharon Cuneta which was revived by Juris Fernandez for the film No Other Woman